The Life Tour was the tenth concert tour by Taiwanese-band Mayday, in support of the band’s ninth studio album History of Tomorrow (2016). The tour began on March 18, 2017 in Kaohsiung, Taiwan, and  concluded on January 6, 2019 in Taichung, Taiwan, comprising 122 concerts.

Background 
On December 31, 2016, during their show in Taipei, Mayday announced their brand new headlining tour under name of Life Tour, which would kick off in Kaohsiung, Taiwan on March 18, 2017.

After tickets went on sale for the Kaohsiung show on January 21, it sells-out in just few minutes, resulting in one extra date being added. Furthermore, the band also announced shows in China. On May 31 the band announced seven dates for North America. In late October, the band announced shows in Paris and London. On March 5, 2018 the band announced shows in Melbourne and Sydney. On September 22, 2018 the band announced the last 10 shows in Taichung which will begin on December 22, 2018. The tour will be conclude on January 6, 2019.

Due to overwhelming demand, the extra shows were added in Kaohsiung, Singapore, Taoyuan, Macau, Suzhou,  Changsha, Hong Kong, Tianjin and Changzhou.

Concert synopsis 
The concert begin with Mayday performing "Party Animal". "Best Day of My Life", "OAOA", "Enter Battle", "Here, After, Us" and "Superman" are subsequently performed. Between sets and costume changes, interlude videos which starring Huang Bo and Mayday, were played on the LED Screen. "You’re Not Truly Happy", "Cheers", "Brotherhood" were performed next, which then seamlessly transition into "Life Co.Ltd". During this part, the band would doing acoustic performance by guitar or short talk with fans. The next act the bassist, Masa, appeared on the left of the stage, performed the first verse of "Almost Famous" with piano. The vocalist, Ashin lifted up then and performed the rest of the song. "The Unbroken Part of My Heart", "Contentment", "Sun Wukong", "Life of Planet" and covered "The Dark Knight" from the collaboration of Ashin and JJ Lin. "Tough" were performed next.

Another costume change took place, and the show continued with Mayday performing Mandarin version of "Do You Ever Shine?". The song was performed with the band members solo performances with their instruments. The collaboration of Mayday and Jam Hsiao, "Song of Ordinary People", "(Leaving the Earth's Surface (Jump!)", “Anywhere Door" and "People Life, Ocean Wild" were performed next. After Mayday down the stage, the fans shouts Jia Ban, which means overtime work in Mandarin, instead of shouts Enocre.

Mayday appeared on stage again and performed the encore part. The encore songs they played, such as "Don’ts Don’ts (Sad People Shouldn't Listen Slow Songs)" and "Stubborn", were different in every shows. Usually the band encore twice. As the concert conclude, a video with samples of "Best Day of My Life" were played to say Good-bye to the fans.

Commercial performance 
This tour has visited 55 cities and comprising 122 shows in total. It has become the biggest scaled and the most attendees tour that the band ever had, nearly 90 shows were held in the massive outdoor stadiums, and attracted more than 4.15 million people. All tickets were nearly sold-out, resulting extra shows in few cities were added. Including Hong Kong, Singapore, Shanghai and Beijing, the band visited two times in this tour. The tour grossed around USD$250-275 million.

Boxscore

Filming

MAYDAY LIFE 3D 
On August 26, 2018, after the show in Beijing, the band held a press conference to announce the tour will be filmed and is set to be released in theaters as a movie in 2019. At the same day's show was the last day of filming, they decided to hold the press conference on this day. The band hope to express the real feelings to the audiences, so the movie will be released in 3D.

Set list
This set list is representative of the show on March 18, 2017 in Kaohsiung, Taiwan. It does not represent all concerts for the duration of the tour.

"Party Animals"
"Best Day of My Life" 
"OAOA (Right Now is Eternity)"
"Loneliness Terminator"
"Enter Battle"
"2012"
"I Won't Let You Be Lonely"
"Superman"
"You're Not Truly Happy" 
"Here, After Us" 
"Song About You" 
"Cheers"
"Brotherhood" 
"Life. Co Ltd." 
"Almost Famous" 
"The Yet Unbroken Part of My Heart" 
"Sun Wukong" 
"Contentment" 
"Life of Planet" 
"The Dark Knight"
"Tough" 
"Do You Ever Shine? (Mandarin version)"
"Leaving the Earth's Surface (Jump!)" 
"What If We Had Never Met" 
"Anywhere Door" 
"Final Chapter"
"People Life, Ocean Wild"
Encore
"Do Mi So" 
"Don'ts Don'ts (Sad People Shouldn't Listen Slow Song)"
"Crazy World" 
"Stubborn" 
"Motor Rock"
"This is Love" 
"Fool"

This set list is representative of the show on June 23, 2018 in Shijiazhuang, China. It does not represent all concerts for the duration of the tour.

"Party Animals"
"Don'ts Don'ts (Sad People Shouldn't Listen Slow Song)"
"OAOA (Right Now is Eternity)"
"Enter Battle Song"
"Here, After Us"
"Superman"
"You're Not Truly Happy"
"Tenderness"
"Cheers"
"Brotherhood"
"Life. Co. Ltd."
"Almost Famous"
"The Yet Unbroken Part of My Heart"
"Contentment"
"Life of Planet"
"The Dark Knight"
"Tough"
"I Will Carry You (A Sole Faith)"
"Song of Ordinary People (Jonathan Lee cover)"
"Leaving the Earth's Surface (Jump!)"
"OK La!"
"Anywhere Door"
"People Life, Ocean Wild"
Encore
"Beginning of the End" 
"I Won't Let You Be Lonely"
"Final Chapter" 
"Love ing" 
"Onion (Aska Yang cover)"
"Suddenly I Miss You" 
"Stubborn"

Tour dates

Cancelled shows

Note

References 

2017 concert tours
2018 concert tours
2019 concert tours